Palestine competed at the 2020 Summer Olympics in Tokyo. Originally scheduled to take place from 24 July to 9 August 2020, the Games were postponed to 23 July to 8 August 2021, due to the COVID-19 pandemic. It is the nation's seventh appearance at the Summer Olympics.

Competitors
The following is the list of number of competitors in the Games.

Athletics

Palestine received a universality slot from the World Athletics to send a female track and field athlete to the Olympics.

Track & road events

Judo

Palestine entered one male judoka into the Olympic tournament after International Judo Federation awarded them a tripartite invitation quota.

Swimming

Palestine received a universality invitation from FINA to send two top-ranked swimmers (one per gender) in their respective individual events to the Olympics, based on the FINA Points System of June 28, 2021.

Weightlifting

Palestine received an invitation from the Tripartite Commission and the IWF to send Mohammed Hamada in the men's 96-kg category to the Olympics.

References

Olympics
2020
Nations at the 2020 Summer Olympics